Commercial Road Lock is a lock on the Regent's Canal in the London Borough of Tower Hamlets. It marks the point at which the canal enters Limehouse Basin, and is the penultimate lock before the canal reaches the Thames.

The nearest Docklands Light Railway station is Limehouse.

Gallery

See also

Canals of the United Kingdom
History of the British canal system

References

Locks on the Regent's Canal
Geography of the London Borough of Tower Hamlets
Buildings and structures in the London Borough of Tower Hamlets
Limehouse